In mathematics and theoretical physics, Noether's second theorem relates symmetries of an action functional with a system of differential equations.  The action S of a physical system is an integral of a so-called Lagrangian function L, from which the system's behavior can be determined by the principle of least action.  

Specifically, the theorem says that if the action has an infinite-dimensional Lie algebra of infinitesimal symmetries parameterized linearly by k arbitrary functions and their derivatives up to order m, then the functional derivatives of L satisfy a system of k differential equations.

Noether's second theorem is sometimes used in gauge theory.  Gauge theories are the basic elements of all modern field theories of physics, such as the prevailing Standard Model.

The theorem is named after Emmy Noether.

See also
 Noether's first theorem
 Noether identities
 Gauge symmetry (mathematics)

Notes

References

Further reading

 
 
 
 

Theoretical physics
Calculus of variations
Partial differential equations
Conservation laws
Theorems in mathematical physics
Quantum field theory
Symmetry